The Southern Intercollegiate Athletic Association (SIAA) was one of the first collegiate athletic conferences in the United States.  Twenty-seven of the current Division I FBS (formerly Division I-A) football programs were members of this conference at some point, as were at least 19 other schools. Every member of the current Southeastern Conference except Arkansas and Missouri, as well as six of the 15 current members of the Atlantic Coast Conference plus future SEC member University of Texas at Austin, currently of the Big 12 Conference (and previously of the now defunct Southwest Conference), formerly held membership in the SIAA.

History

The first attempt (1892–1893)

Largely forgotten to history is the first brief year of competition played by the SIAA.  On December 28, 1892, a meeting between most of the prominent Southern college athletic programs was held at Richmond's Exchange Hotel, organized by members of Virginia's athletic association with the purpose of organizing athletics, especially regular athletic championships, in baseball, football, tennis, and track.  Colleges present at the meeting were North Carolina, Wake Forest, Sewanee, Virginia, St. John's (of Maryland), Johns Hopkins, Tennessee, and Alabama.  Presiding over the first meeting was Dr. F. P. Venable, of North Carolina, and secretary was J. B. Robertson, of Virginia; Robertson was later elected as president, with W. S. Symington, of Johns Hopkins, elected as vice president, and W. H. Graham, of Sewanee, elected as secretary and treasurer.

The league was split into two "circuits", with the "Northern" one comprising Maryland, Virginia, and North Carolina, and the "Southern" one comprising Tennessee and Alabama; the champion of each circuit would play each other for the championship of the SIAA each year, with yearly championship matches scheduled for Thanksgiving for football and May 13 for baseball.  Interestingly, whichever team won the championship in baseball had the privilege of naming the next session's president, while the winner of each year's football championship was to name the next vice president.

The original division of the teams had Virginia, North Carolina, Wake Forest, Johns Hopkins, and St. John's College in the Northern Division, and Tennessee, Sewanee, and Alabama in the Southern Division.  In mid-February, a special session was held to add Vanderbilt to the Southern Division, resulting in a 5-team Northern Division and a 4-team Southern Division.

The league also took on the usual matters of interest in terms of purifying and organizing athletics at the time, including banning former professional players.  The overall goal was generally to "encourage and stimulate athletics among colleges of the South."

After just one season of baseball, the Association was embroiled by controversy.  Virginia had a straightforward claim to champion of the Northern Division; though Virginia and Johns Hopkins had been scheduled to meet in a game for champion of the Northern Division, Johns Hopkins forfeited the game after faculty forbade the team from leaving campus on May 3, the day the final division game had been scheduled for.  The champion of the Southern Division was not so easily decided.  On May 11, 1893, after a full season of SIAA baseball play, an arbitration committee set out to determine whether Vanderbilt, Alabama, or Sewanee had topped the Southern Division, as the teams had a split record with no clear winner.  This was made more difficult due to an eligibility controversy between Vanderbilt and Alabama, with Vanderbilt claiming that two Alabama baseball players were ineligible due to professionalism rules.  Owing to this, Vanderbilt claimed Alabama should forfeit two wins to Vanderbilt, despite losing one of the games 2–1.

Eventually, the arbitrators decided in favor of Vanderbilt, leaving a contest between Vanderbilt and Sewanee to determine champion of the Southern Division.  Despite this, there was some discontent within the organization; Secretary Wilders, of Sewanee, opined at length about the decision, describing his distaste about the "secret" nature of the arbitrators.  He closed his column by noting that Vanderbilt and Sewanee need not face off in a championship game, as Sewanee had a better record against member teams (2–1 as opposed to 2–2).  William Dudley, representative of Vanderbilt, fired back a long retort of his own, accusing Wilders of not understanding the rules of the SIAA's constitution.  The game to determine champion of the Southern Division was never played.

A month later sounded the beginning of the end for the first SIAA, when Vanderbilt withdrew from the Association, preceded by Tennessee.  Another month later, the SIAA formally folded.  Football analysts of the time wrote that the failure was because the association was composed of colleges scattered too far apart.  Though the hopes were high that Virginia, North Carolina, and Johns Hopkins would form a new association in September, this appears to have never come to fruition.

The SIAA (1894–1942) 

The SIAA was founded on December 21, 1894, by Dr. William Dudley, a chemistry professor at Vanderbilt, at the Kimball House in Atlanta. Dudley was a member of the Vanderbilt Athletic Association, formed in 1886 with Dr. W. M. Baskerville as president. Most students at Vanderbilt were members. The early sports played on the Vanderbilt campus were baseball, bicycling, and track and field events. Dudley was primarily responsible for the formation of the Southern Intercollegiate Athletic Association. The first advance in the direction of its formation was in March 1888 when the Vanderbilt Athletic Association endeavored to secure track and field meets at Vanderbilt from Southwestern Presbyterian University, Sewanee, and Tennessee. Sewanee's opposition stopped it from occurring.

The original members were Alabama, Auburn, Georgia, Johns Hopkins, North Carolina, Sewanee, Vanderbilt, and Virginia. Virginia and North Carolina soon dropped out, even before the inaugural 1895 season.

Central (Eastern Kentucky), Clemson, Cumberland, Kentucky, LSU, Mercer, Mississippi A&M (Mississippi State), Southwestern Presbyterian University, Texas, Tulane, and the University of Nashville joined the following year in 1895 as invited charter members. The conference was originally formed for "the development and purification of college athletics throughout the South". They crafted a constitution, created an Executive Committee, elected officers, and set rules for:
annual conventions
officiating
limiting players to five years of eligibility
banning professional athletes
requiring athletes to attend the school they represent
banning instructors and professors from playing
suspensions of individuals and schools
expenses

The league did not, however, sponsor much in the way of championship competition for its member schools. It did hold an annual track and field competition for a trophy, and it also held some basketball tournaments over the years, but apparently some member schools did not compete in the tournament during some years, and sometimes non-member southern schools were even allowed to compete in it as well. In 1903, a single-game football playoff occurred, but it seems to have been coordinated more so by the two competing schools (Clemson and Cumberland) than the conference itself. Several other efforts over the years by individual schools (rather than by the SIAA) to hold a conference title game fell through. Most SIAA titles claimed by schools in various sports were actually more mythical in nature than officially sanctioned by the league. Indeed, some schools centrally-located in the conference played far more conference games than others on the periphery, making it difficult to form a fair comparison to determine just which team was truly the best, especially once the league began to constantly expand its membership.

In 1915, a disagreement arose within the conference regarding the eligibility of freshman athletes, the so-called "one-year rule." Generally, the larger universities opposed the eligibility of freshman players, while the smaller schools favored it. As a result, some of the large universities formed the Southern Intercollegiate Conference (now the Southern Conference), which used the one-year rule, while still maintaining membership within the SIAA.

At the conference's annual meeting on December 10, 1920, the SIAA rejected proposals to ban freshman athletes and abolish paid summer baseball.  In protest, some schools that had voted in favor of the propositions immediately announced they would seek to form a new conference.   On February 25, 1921, Alabama, Auburn, Clemson, Georgia, Georgia Tech, Kentucky, Mississippi State, and Tennessee left the SIAA to form the Southern Conference, along with non-SIAA members Maryland, North Carolina, North Carolina State, Virginia, Virginia Tech, and Washington and Lee.  In 1922, the Southern Conference underwent an expansion and added six more members, all at the expense of the SIAA: Florida, Louisiana State, Mississippi, South Carolina, Tulane, and Vanderbilt.

With the departure of most of the major colleges, the SIAA became a de facto small college conference in 1923. In the 1920s and 1930s, the SIAA increased its membership with the addition of many additional small universities. The conference eventually disbanded in 1942 with the onset of American involvement in World War II. League archives were kept at Vanderbilt, the league's founding school, but the building housing the archives was eventually gutted with fire, taking countless irreplaceable items pertaining to the SIAA's history with it.

In 1947 there was an attempt, led by Western Kentucky, to revive the SIAA.  Western Kentucky hosted an SIAA basketball tournament that turned out to be little more than an invitational tournament because former SIAA members declined to participate.

Membership

Original charter members from the 1894 SIAA are denoted in boldface; this list is the same as the members from the 1892–1893 SIAA with the replacement of Wake Forest, Tennessee, and St. John's from the 1892 league with Auburn and Georgia. Invited charter members are denoted with an asterisk. In the era in which the SIAA operated, teams tended to join in December; therefore, the first year of conference play in a given sport was often the following calendar year.

Conference affiliations reflect those for the 2016–17 school year.

Timeline

Conference champions
 List of SIAA football champions
 List of SIAA basketball champions
 List of SIAA baseball champions

References

External links
SIAA Handbook, 1895